Gunnar Hilding Persson (31 December 1884 - 21 December 1972) was a Swedish wrestler, who, at the 1908 Summer Olympics, competed for Sweden in the Greco-Roman lightweight, finishing in fourth place.

References

1884 births
1977 deaths
Olympic wrestlers of Sweden
Wrestlers at the 1908 Summer Olympics
Swedish male sport wrestlers
People from Simrishamn Municipality
Sportspeople from Skåne County